Benjamin Peter Cameron (born 21 February 1981) is an Australian cricket coach and former player.

Cameron played for South Australia from 2004 to 2007, playing ten first-class games and nine List A games as a right-handed opening batsman. He scored two half-centuries on his Sheffield Shield debut against Victoria.

Cameron retired from playing in 2007 due to a chronic knee condition. He subsequently took up coaching and coached in South Australian Premier Cricket. He was appointed high performance manager at Vanuatu Cricket and head coach of the Vanuatu national cricket team in March 2022. However, he resigned the positions in January 2023 citing personal reasons.

References

Cricinfo: Ben Cameron

1981 births
Living people
Australian cricketers
South Australia cricketers
Cricketers from Hobart
Australian expatriate sportspeople in Vanuatu
Australian cricket coaches
Coaches of the Vanuatu national cricket team